The Grand Duchy of Nizhny Novgorod-Suzdal was an East Slavic principality formed in 1341. Its main towns were Nizhny Novgorod, Suzdal, Gorokhovets, Gorodets, and Kurmysh. Nizhny Novgorod was the seat of the principality from 1350.

References

History of Nizhny Novgorod